Norman William Frederick Fisher  (5 September 193619 February 1997) was a senior Australian public servant in Canberra.

Fisher held many positions in the Australian Public Service, including Foundation Director, Bureau of Labour Market Research (1980); Director, Department of Employment and Industrial Relations (1982); Deputy Commissioner, Public Service Board (1986); Director, ACT Institute of Technical and Further Education 1988–1993; and again from 1993 until his retirement in 1997. He was founding Director of the Australian International Hotel School.

Awards and honours
Fisher was appointed a Member of the Order of Australia on 9 June 1986 "in recognition of service in the fields of labour market research and public administration".

In 2001, a street in the Canberra suburb of Bruce was named Norman Fisher Circuit in Fisher's honour.

Notes

References

 

 

1936 births
1997 deaths
Members of the Order of Australia
People from Canberra
People from the Australian Capital Territory
Australian public servants